Morionia is a genus of moths of the family Zygaenidae. It consists of only one species, Morionia sciara, which is found in Taiwan.

References

Procridinae
Monotypic moth genera
Moths of Taiwan